Robert Montagu may refer to:

 Robert Montagu, 3rd Earl of Manchester (1634–1683), English politician and courtier
 Robert Montagu, 3rd Duke of Manchester (c. 1710–1762), MP
 Robert Montagu (politician) (died 1693)
 Lord Robert Montagu (1825–1902), British Conservative politician

See also
Robert Montague (disambiguation)